Bookspan LLC is a New York–based online bookseller, founded in 2000. 

Bookspan began as a joint endeavor by Bertelsmann and Time Warner. Bertelsmann took over control in 2007, and a year later, sold its interest to Najafi Companies, an Arizona investment firm. Najafi held its ownership in a subsidiary named Direct Brands, which also held Najafi's ownership in the Columbia House record club. In 2013, Najafi sold its interest in Direct Brands to Pride Tree Holdings, a New York–based media and consumer technology holding company founded in 2012 and incorporated in Delaware.

Bookspan operates a number of discount book purchasing programs. As of 2017, the programs include:

 Crafter's Choice
 Crossings Book Club
 Doubleday Book Club
 The Good Cook
 History Book Club
 The Literary Guild
 Mystery Guild
 Science Fiction Book Club

References

External links
 

American companies established in 2000
Internet properties established in 2000
Retail companies established in 2000